Calgary-Mackay-Nose Hill was a provincial electoral district in Calgary, Alberta, Canada, mandated to return a single member to the Legislative Assembly of Alberta using the first past the post method of voting from 2012 to 2019.

History
The electoral district was created in the 2010 Alberta boundary re-distribution. It was created when Calgary-Mackay and Calgary-Nose Hill were merged along with a large chunk of Calgary-McCall.

The Calgary-Mackay-Nose Hill electoral district was dissolved in the 2017 electoral boundary re-distribution into Calgary-Beddington and Calgary-North electoral districts ahead of the 2019 Alberta general election.

Boundary history

Electoral history

The antecedent electoral districts that comprise Calgary-Mackay-Nose Hill generally returned Progressive Conservative candidates for many years. Progressive Conservative MLA Neil Brown was the first elected member for the electoral district in 2012. Neil Brown would be defeated by New Democratic MLA Karen McPherson in 2015. McPherson would leave the NDP caucus in 2017 and join the Alberta Party a week later.

Legislature results

2012 general election

2015 general election

Senate nominee results

2012 Senate nominee election district results

Student vote results

2012 election

See also
List of Alberta provincial electoral districts

References

External links
Elections Alberta
The Legislative Assembly of Alberta

Former provincial electoral districts of Alberta
Politics of Calgary